Alessandro Gherardini (16 November 1655 – 1726) was an Italian painter of the Baroque period, active mainly in Florence.

He was the pupil of the painter Alessandro Rosi. In Florence, he painted a Crucifixion for the Monastery of the Augustines adjacent to Santa Maria dei Candeli; and frescoes from the Life of St. Anthony for the Convent of San Marco. He painted frescoes on the Life of Alexander the Great for Casa Orlandini. He is described as a competitor for commissions in Florence with Anton Domenico Gabbiani. Among Gherardini's pupils was Sebastiano Galeotti, who later moved to Genoa.

References

External links

1655 births
1723 deaths
17th-century Italian painters
Italian male painters
18th-century Italian painters
Painters from Florence
Italian Baroque painters
18th-century Italian male artists